PCCTS may refer to:

Purdue Compiler Construction Tool Set, the predecessor of the ANTLR parser generator
Pauperes commilitones Christi Templique Solomonici, the Knights Templar